Somashekhar SP is an Indian robotic surgeon, author and chairman of medical advisory board at Aster DM Healthcare - GCC & India. He is also the global director of Aster International Institute of Oncology in GCC & India. He is the president of the Association of Breast Surgeons of India, editor in chief of the IJGO Springer Indian Journal of Gynec Oncology and council member of The Association of Surgeons of India. He is also the editor of Annals of Breast Diseases.

Career
Somashekhar SP started his career as a consultant and assistant professor in the Department of Oncosurgery at Gujarat Cancer Research Institute, Ahmedabad. Later, he joined Manipal Comprehensive Cancer Centre of Manipal Hospitals, Bangalore. Currently he is with Aster Hospitals as a Lead Consultant in Surgical & Gynaecological Oncology & Robotic Surgeon, HIPEC & PIPAC Super-specialist. Dr. Somashekhar helped to implement IBM Watson for Oncology, an artificial intelligence technology for diagnosis and treatment of cancer.

Somashekhar SP is a teaching faculty for MS-General surgery PG students for Kathmandu University School of Medical Sciences and for Diplomate of National Board (DNB) examinations surgical oncology training program. He is also the reviewer of various scientific journals such as the World Journal of Oncology, World Journal of Surgery, European Journal of Surgical Oncology, Annals of Oncology, Indian Journal of Surgery, and Indian Journal of Surgical Oncology.

Honors and achievements
Initiated HIPEC program for Peritoneal Surface Malignancy in India.
Performed earliest & popularized Sentinel lymph node biopsy procedure in India.
First in India to initiate Robotic Scarless Thyroidectomy programme & TORS

Research & Publications
Dr. Somashekhar SP. is the editor and author of Various Text Book and operative Atlas's on Oncosurgery and Breast surgery, Gynecological oncology & Robotic surgery.

References

External links
Spmashekhar speech at San Antonio Breast Cancer Symposium, San Antonio, Texas, USA
Somashekhar SP

Medical doctors from Karnataka
Indian thoracic surgeons
Living people
Year of birth missing (living people)
Fellows of the Royal College of Surgeons of Edinburgh